Ahmed Sharif is a Bangladeshi actor who has acted in more than eight hundred Bengali films.

Filmography

References

External links
 

Year of birth missing (living people)
Living people
20th-century Bangladeshi male actors
Bangladeshi male film actors
Recipients of the National Film Awards (Bangladesh)